The Charter of the Commonwealth of Independent States, also known as the Statutes of the Commonwealth of Independent States, (CIS Charter; , Ustav Sodruzhestva Nezavisimyh Gosudarstv, Устав СНГ) is an international agreement between the states forming the Commonwealth of Independent States (CIS).

History
The Charter was signed on 22 January, 1993 in Minsk by the heads of state of the Commonwealth of Independent States (CIS) and was subsequently deposited with the United Nations. It defines the objectives, bodies and functions of the CIS, as well as the criteria for membership. Russia, Belarus, Armenia, Kazakhstan, Kyrgyzstan, Moldova, Tajikistan, and Uzbekistan signed and ratified the treaty, while Azerbaijan acceded to it later. Georgia also acceded to the treaty in 1993, with the accession taking effect in 1994 but withdrew from it in 2008, with the withdrawal taking legal effect in 2009. Ukraine and Turkmenistan did not sign or accede to the treaty, although they were considered to be part of the CIS when the treaty was signed.

Membership

The CIS Charter treaty agreement defines which countries are considered members of the CIS. According to Article 7, only countries that have ratified this treaty are considered members. However, the same article defines the countries that had ratified the Treaty for the Establishment of the CIS and its related protocol as "founding states of the CIS". This has created legal uncertainty, as Ukraine and Turkmenistan ratified the treaty and protocol, and therefore are considered "founding states of the CIS". Ukraine and Turkmenistan never ratified the CIS Charter, and therefore could not be considered members of the CIS, once the Charter came into effect. Nevertheless, both Ukraine and Turkmenistan have continued participating in the CIS, with Turkmenistan becoming an associate member of the CIS in August 2005, following the procedure defined in Article 8 of the Charter.

Ukraine

Ukraine stopped participating in the CIS in 2018,  creating uncertainty regarding the procedure that had to be followed to cease being a part of the CIS. As of December 2018, Ukraine is not a member of the CIS and has stopped participating in it. Nevertheless, it remains a party to the treaty and related protocol, and, as per the charter, is a "founding state of the CIS", unless the charter is amended or annulled.

Additionally, according to the Treaty for the Establishment of the CIS and its related protocol, as well as the other Alma-Ata declarations of 1991, Ukraine forms part of the CIS. Therefore, while Ukraine has effectively quit its unofficial participation in its current form in the CIS, the CIS secretariat has noted that it has not received formal notice from Ukraine of its withdrawal. Therefore, the CIS secretariat (as well as the Russian envoy to the CIS) considers that Ukraine is still a state that has not quit the CIS and may participate in it. To this end, the CIS secretariat stated that they will keep inviting Ukraine to participate, even though Ukraine is not a member, and has officially and formally decided to stop participating.

Furthermore, the CIS Charter treaty is also the treaty that essentially formalized the Commonwealth of Independent States, as it signified the legal connection between the countries that signed the Alma-Ata Protocol and broadened the Commonwealth of Independent States to legally include these states. Nevertheless, at the same time, it formally defined Ukraine and Turkmenistan as non-member states, as these countries never ratified this treaty. However, these countries were treated by the member states of the CIS as equals in the context of the CIS for more than a decade, being invited to participate, leading to the informal term "state-participants" for them. It is worth noting that neither Ukraine nor Turkmenistan ever applied the CIS Charter treaty even provisionally while being allowed to participate in the CIS after 1993. They were also allowed to take part in the bodies of the CIS, such as its Interparliamentary Assembly.

Georgia

Georgia withdrew from the CIS Charter and all other CIS-related treaties, such as the Treaty for the Establishment of the CIS and its related protocol in 18 August, 2008. This decision took effect, according to the Charter, on 12 August, 2009. 

Georgia withdrew from the CIS Defense Ministers on 3 February 2006, as membership in that group was not compatible with participation in NATO.

See also 

 Alma-Ata Protocol

References

Commonwealth of Independent States law